Austria women's national under-19 football team is the football team representing Austria in competitions for under-19 year old players and is controlled by the Austrian Football Association. The team managed to qualify once for the UEFA Women's Under-19 Championship in 2016.

Competitive record

FIFA U-20 Women's World Cup

*Draws include knockout matches decided on penalty kicks.

UEFA Women's Under-19 Championship
The team qualified for the first time in 2016.

*Draws include knockout matches decided on penalty kicks.

Results and fixtures

 The following is a list of match results in the last 12 months, as well as any future matches that have been scheduled.

Legend

2022

See also

 Austria women's national football team
 Austria women's national under-17 football team
 Women's association football around the world
 Austria men's national football team

References

F
Women's national under-19 association football teams